Horst Witzler (born 18 August 1932) is a retired German football manager.

References

1932 births
Living people
German football managers
SV Meppen managers
SV Arminia Hannover managers
Schwarz-Weiß Essen managers
Borussia Dortmund managers
Rot-Weiss Essen managers
Alemannia Aachen managers
K.A.S. Eupen managers
West German expatriate football managers
Expatriate football managers in Belgium
West German expatriate sportspeople in Belgium
West German football managers
Sportspeople from Wuppertal